Gmina Hażlach is a rural gmina (administrative district) in Cieszyn County, Silesian Voivodeship, in southern Poland, in the historical region of Cieszyn Silesia. Its seat is the village of Hażlach.

Villages

Neighbouring gminas
Gmina Hażlach is bordered by the gminas of Cieszyn, Dębowiec, Strumień and Zebrzydowice. It also borders the Czech Republic.

References

External links
  Official website

Hazlach
Gmina Hazlach
Cieszyn Silesia